The 6th SS Mountain Division "Nord" was a German unit of the Waffen-SS during World War II, formed in February 1941 as SS Kampfgruppe Nord (SS Battle Group North).

The division was the only Waffen-SS unit to fight in the Arctic Circle when it was stationed in Finland and northern Russia between June and November 1941. It fought in Karelia until the Moscow Armistice in September 1944, at which point it left Finland. It fought in the Operation Nordwind in January 1945, where it suffered heavy losses. In early April 1945, the division was destroyed by U.S. forces near Büdingen, Germany.

Operation Barbarossa

The division was formed from the units of the SS-Totenkopfverbände (concentration camp guards) to guard the border with the Soviet Union following the 1940 German occupation of Norway. In the spring of 1941, the newly formed division was moved into positions at Salla in northern Finland with General Nikolaus von Falkenhorst in command.

The 6th SS Nord Division was made up mostly of volunteers from Hungary, Romania, and a few Norwegians. In time the division formed a SS-Gebirgsbrigade formed by volunteering Norwegians and Finns. An Austrian Regiment was also attached. A number of Swiss volunteers served in the division.

Prior to the invasion of the Soviet Union, Operation Barbarossa, a new unit was attached, SS Gebirgsjäger (Mountain) Artillery Regiment 6, and the brigade was redesignated a division, 6th SS Division Nord.

The new division, partly as a result of inadequate training and poor leadership, soon became notorious for twice breaking in the face of enemy forces. When it took part in Operation Arctic Fox, more than half of its infantry units broke and retreated in disarray. In September 1941 the division was attached to the Finnish III Corps under General Hjalmar Siilasvuo, and took up defensive positions at Kiestinki (Kestenga) in the Loukhsky District. The division broke for a second time, after a panic took hold among personnel, who came to believe that they were facing a major attack by Soviet armored forces.

By the end of 1941, it had lost a significant proportion of its fighting personnel, from both combat and non-combat related causes. Over the winter of 1941–42 it received replacements from the general pool of Waffen-SS recruits.

1942–1945
Throughout the rest of 1942 and through 1943 it remained on the Kestenga front, which was quiet compared to other areas of the Eastern Front. In September 1942, the unit was renamed as the SS Mountain Division Nord. In September 1944 it was ordered to withdraw from Finland, upon the conclusion of a separate armistice between Finland and the Soviet Union. The division then formed the rear guard for the three German corps withdrawing from Finland in Operation Birch and from September to November 1944 marched 1,600 kilometers to Mo i Rana, Norway, where it entrained for the southern end of the country. The Norwegian Ski-Battalion unit was then left behind, in accordance with their contracts. They were merged into "SS-und-Schi-Jäger-Polizei-Battalion 506 (mot.) with app. 50% men from different German Police units in South Norway. The rest of the division was transferred to Germany.

The division briefly refitted in Denmark where its losses were replaced by young Volksdeutsche (ethnic Germans) who had been conscripted into the Waffen-SS and received only a brief training. The division took part in Operation Nordwind in the Low Vosges mountains of northeastern France. By 2 January, part of the division (SS Gebirgs Regiment 12 and 506th Battalion) went into action against the U.S. 45th Infantry Division, attached to 361st Volksgrenadier Division. For six days the SS men fought in and around the town of Wingen, finally being pushed back by the U.S. forces with most of the battle group killed or captured. On 16 January, the SS Regiment 11 surrounded six companies of the American 157th Infantry Regiment. The American troops were forced to surrender three days later, losing 482 men. Nord advanced for six more days before being stopped by American counterattacks. German attempts at a breakthrough were halted altogether by 30 January.

The division remained on the western front after the Nordwind offensive, fighting American forces around Trier and Koblenz on the Moselle River in March.  By Easter 1945 it numbered about 2,000 soldiers, including stragglers from other units.  It still had six howitzers and an assault gun.  The division refused to give up, and moved east to re-establish contact with other German units.  However, as it moved, it drew the attention of the US Army by cutting American lines of communication.  In early April 1945 over the course of several days the U.S. 71st Division fought a series of meeting engagements with the 6th SS Division Nord.  As a result, the division was destroyed; its personnel scattered or captured.

Commanders
Brigadeführer Karl Herrmann, (28 February 1941 – 15 May 1941)
Obergruppenführer Karl-Maria Demelhuber, (15 May 1941 – 1 April 1942)
Obergruppenführer Matthias Kleinheisterkamp, (1 April 1942 – 20 April 1942)
Oberführer Hans Scheider, (20 April 1942 – 14 June 1942)
Obergruppenführer Matthias Kleinheisterkamp  (14 June 1942 – 15 January 1944)
Gruppenführer Lothar Debes, (15 January 1944 – 14 June 1944)
Obergruppenführer Friedrich-Wilhelm Krüger, (14 June 1944 – 23 August 1944)
Brigadeführer Gustav Lombard, (23 August 1944 – 1 September 1944)
Gruppenführer Karl Brenner, (1 September 1944 – 3 April 1945)
Standartenführer Franz Schreiber, (3 April 1945 – 8 May 1945)

Area of operations
Finland & northern Russia      (June 1941 – November 1944)
Norway & Denmark       (November 1944 – January 1945)
Western Germany        (January 1945 – April 1945)
Austria        (April 1945 – May 1945)

Manpower strength
June 1941: 10,373
December 1942: 21,247
December 1943: 20,129
June 1944: 19,355
December 1944: 15,000

Order of battle
Order of battle 22 April 1941 (as Kampfgruppe Nord) 
Prior to divisional status, the unit was known as KG Nord. It was formed on 28 Feb 1941, and a flak battalion was added on 21 Apr 1941.

 6th SS-Infantry Regiment (3 Battalions & 13, 14th companies)
 7th SS-Infantry Regiment (3 Battalions & 13, 14th companies)
 Reconnaissance Battalion 
 Artillery Regiment (3 Light Battalions)
 Pioneer Companies (2 of)
 Signals Battalion
 Supply Troop
 Divisional Administration
 Medical Service
 Military Police Detachment
 Field Post Office

Order of battle September 1941
At its inception in September 1941 the division was made up of the following units:

 Division Staff
 SS-Infantry Regiment 6
 SS-Infantry Regiment 7
 SS-Infantry Regiment 9 (left the division in December 1941)
 SS-Gebirgs Artillery Regiment "Nord"
 SS-Panzerjäger (Tank Hunter) Battalion "Nord"
 SS-Reconnaissance Battalion "Nord"
 SS-Flak Battalion "Nord"
 SS-Gebirgs Engineer Battalion "Nord"
 SS-Gebirgs Signal Battalion "Nord"
 SS-Division Supply Commander "Nord"

Order of battle 1942
After being designated SS-Gebirgs-Division „Nord“ on 15 January 1942 the division's units were all renamed as Gebirgs (Mountain) units and the infantry regiments renamed and renumbered. The division was given the number 6 on 22 October 1943. The new structure was as follows:

 Division Staff
 SS-Gebirgsjäger Regiment 11 "Reinhard Heydrich" with three battalions
 SS-Gebirgsjäger Regiment 12 ″Michael Gaißmair″ with three battalions
 SS-Infantry Regiment (motorized) 5 (added in 1944)
 SS-Skijäger Battalion "Norge" (a Norwegian volunteer unit)
 SS-Gebirgs Artillery Regiment 6 with three artillery groups
 SS-Werfer Battalion 6 (Rocket artillery)
 SS-Gebirgs Panzerjäger Battalion 6 (Anti-tank cannons)
 SS-Gebirgs Reconnaissance Battalion (motorized) 6
 SS-Flak Battalion 6 (Anti-aircraft artillery)
 SS-Gebirgs Engineer Battalion 6
 SS-Gebirgs Signal Battalion 6
 SS-Division Supply Commander 6
 SS-Feldersatz Battalion 6 (Reserve and training battalion used to prepare new arrivals to fill up depleted units)
 SS-Sturmgeschütz Battery 6 (Assault Guns)
 SS-Gebirgs-Kriegsberichter Platoon 6 (Propaganda Platoon)
 SS-Feldgendarmerie Platoon 6 (Military Police)

See also
 List of Waffen-SS units
 Karelian Front

References

Footnotes

Bibliography
Ian Baxter - 6th SS Mountain Division Nord at War 1941-1945
George F. Nafziger - The German Order of Battle: Waffen SS and Other Units in World War II

Further reading
Massimiliano Afiero - The 6th Waffen-SS Gebirgs (Mountain) Division Nord
Stephen M. Rusiecki - In Final Defense of the Reich: The destruction of the 6th SS Mountain Division "Nord"
George H. Stein - The Waffen-SS: Hitler's Elite Guard at War 1939–1945Peter Strassner - European VolunteersWolf T. Zoepf - Seven Days in January: With the 6th SS-Mountain Division in Operation Nordwind''

06
German units in the Arctic
Continuation War
Military units and formations established in 1941
Mountain divisions of the Waffen-SS
Military units and formations disestablished in 1945